The Veltex Shizuoka is a professional basketball team that  competes in the third division of the Japanese B.League.

Coaches
Shota Goto
Rasheed Hazzard
Facundo Müller

Roster

Notable players
Muusa Dama
Luke Evans (fr)
Novar Gadson
Michael Ojo
Reginald Warren

Arenas
Shizuoka City Central Gymnasium
Konohana Arena
Inasa General Gymnasium
Shizuoka City Hokubu Gymnasium
Shizuoka Prefecture Budokan
Shimizu General Sports Park Gymnasium
Gotenba City Gymnasium
Fujikawa Gymnasium
Sawayaka Arena Fukuroi Gymnasium

References

External links

 
Basketball teams in Japan
Sports teams in Shizuoka Prefecture
Basketball teams established in 2018
2018 establishments in Japan
Shizuoka (city)